Azilda Lapierre Marchand  (8 December 1918 – 9 May 2010) was a Québécoise teacher and women's rights advocate, who worked to change the perception of women and their roles in French-Canadian society. Recognizing that many women worked as unpaid labourers either within the family or within family businesses, she became a vocal advocate for their service to be recognized as valuable. A founding member of the Women's Association for Education and Social Action, she served as president of the organization between 1970 and 1975. Participating in numerous international conferences and government commissions, she advocated for improved access to education and civil participation by women. She was a recipient of the Order of Canada and honoured as a knight in the National Order of Quebec.

Early life
Azilda Lapierre was born on 8 December 1918 in Ange-Gardien, Quebec, Canada. After completing her secondary education in Catholic schools, she graduated from the Marier-Rivier Normal School in Saint-Hyacinthe and married Jean-Maurice Marchand of Ange-Gardien, with whom she would have nine children.

Career
Marchand began her career as a teacher, in primary and secondary schools, later participating in adult education. In 1937, she founded the Women's Catholic Agricultural Youth Movement in conjunction with the  movement in Quebec. The organization had been founded in France during the Great Depression as a means to revitalize rural youth, since the First World War had depopulated the countryside and sent many young people to urban areas. The organization recognized the isolation of rural populations and attempted to bring youth back to religion and moral lives by assisting them through the development of educational opportunity and recreational activities.

In the 1950s, she joined the Union of Catholic Rural Women and in 1961, she became the president of the Saint-Hyacinthe branch, serving in that capacity until 1966. That year, she co-founded the Women's Association for Education and Social Action (AFÉAS), an organization aimed at promoting and improving women's civic participation. At the time, society was not in favour of women working outside the home, and public debate ensued regarding paid labour for women. Marchand denounced the detractors and favoured not only encouraging women to participate in the labour force, but urged that the free labour women did in both the home and family business should be acknowledged.

Marchand served as a delegate of the AFÉAS in Rome in 1967 to the Congress of the World Association of Catholic Women's Organizations. She published a brief on the modern workforce in conjunction with AFÉAS in 1969 and presented the findings regarding the invisibility of women's work to the Royal Commission on the Status of Women, led by Florence Bird. The following year, she assumed the presidency of the organization, serving through 1975.

In 1972, Marchand was appointed to the Council for Higher Education, participating in numerous studies on college education and teaching. At her urging, in 1974, the report La femme collaboratrice dans une entreprise familiale (Women as collaborators in a family business) was undertaken by AFÉAS, was prepared to evaluate the vulnerability of women and lack of legal protections for them if they should become separated or divorced. Marchand attended the 1975 World Conference on Women in Mexico City as part of the United Nations' International Women's Year events. From 1974 to 1980, she served as part of the Canadian delegation to UNESCO, as a representative for AFÉAS, and between 1975 and 1980, she served on Québec's Advisory Council on the Status of Women.

Marchand was honoured in 1984 with the Governor General's Awards in Commemoration of the Persons Case for her contributions to women's rights and social work. In 1985, Marchand was honoured as a knight in the National Order of Quebec and with the Order of Canada for her work with women and in education. She was granted an honorary doctorate in social work from the Université de Sherbrooke in 1987, by Pierre Martel, who in his remarks stated that she had changed the collective consciousness of Québécois on how women should be perceived and how they could behave. AFÉAS created the Prix Azilda Marchand to recognize those with exemplary contributions in social work and women's rights.

Death and legacy
Marchand died on 9 May 2010 in Ange-Gardien, Quebec, Canada. AFÉAS created the Prix Azilda Marchand to recognize those with exemplary contributions in social work and women's rights.

References

Citations

Bibliography

1918 births
2010 deaths
People from Saint-Jérôme
Canadian women's rights activists
Canadian educators
Governor General's Award in Commemoration of the Persons Case winners